C. brassicae may refer to:

 Calonectria brassicae, an ascomycete fungus
 Candida brassicae, a pathogenic microbe
 Cercosporella brassicae, a plant pathogen
 Colletotrichum brassicae, a plant pathogen
 Crotonia brassicae, a St. Helena mite